Rupert Hoogewerf (born 1970 in Luxembourg), also known by his Chinese name Hu Run, is the chairman and chief researcher of Hurun Report, a research, media and investments business, best known for its Hurun Rich List, a ranking of the wealthiest individuals in China. A qualified chartered accountant (ICAEW), Hoogewerf worked for Arthur Andersen, before launching Hurun Report.

Early life
Rupert Hoogewerf was born in Luxembourg, son of Francis and Angela Hoogewerf, graduated with a BA in Chinese and Japanese at Durham University (St Cuthbert's Society) in 1993. Before that, he was at Eton College and St Ronan's School.

Career

Accountant
After university, Hoogewerf worked for 7 years at Arthur Andersen in London and Shanghai, shortly after arriving in China Hoogewerf launched Hurun Report.

Hurun Report
Founded in 1999, Hurun Report is a private company that produces lists and research. The company's flagship product is the Hurun Rich List.

Through Hurun Report, Rupert Hoogewerf became widely regarded as an influential opinion former in China

Other key IPs include Hurun Global Unicorns, a ranking of the world’s most valuable privately-held businesses set up after 2000; Hurun China 500 Private Companies, a ranking of the most valuable non state-owned companies in China; and Hurun Art List, a ranking of the world’s best-selling artists, based on the sales of their works at public auction.

Hurun's mission is Promoting Entrepreneurship through Lists and Research. Its main business operations are in China, India and the UK.

Hurun India
Hurun launched Hurun India in 2012, under the leadership of Anas Rahman Junaid, a graduate of University of Oxford. Junaid met Rupert through Oxford University and the duo thought it was the right time to speak about wealth creation in India as they saw India booming.

He came in the news when he announced that he will share 10% of profits from his personal startup investments with his long-term employees.

Awards
Hoogewerf was awarded the Person of the Year Award in 2002 by Newsweekly magazine, and in September 2009 was presented with the Shanghai Magnolia Award. Named after Shanghai's official flower, this is the highest honor bestowed by the city on foreigners.

Durham University Business School in November 2018 appointed Hoogewerf to its academic staff as a Professor in Practice, in recognition of his substantial lifetime contribution to the advancement and application within his chosen profession.

Personal life
Hoogewerf is married and lives with his wife and three children in Shanghai, China, and Oxford, UK.

References

External links 
 

1970 births
Living people
English accountants
British publishers (people)
Businesspeople in mass media
Alumni of St Cuthbert's Society, Durham
Renmin University of China alumni
Luxembourgian businesspeople
People educated at Eton College
Luxembourgian accountants